Rick Vallin (born Eric Efron; September 24, 1919 – August 31, 1977) was an actor who appeared in more than 150 films between 1938 and 1966.

Early years

Born in Feodosia, in the Crimea, Russia, Vallin came to the United States at age three with his South American mother, Mrs. Nardine Thomes, on the S/S Muskegon, which arrived at the Port of Boston on May 6, 1922. His father, an Imperial Army officer, was murdered by the Bolsheviks. His mother, known as Nadja Yatsenko, was a ballerina in Tsarist Russia; in the States, she was billed as a Gypsy dancer.

Career 
In 1940, Vallin (billed as Eric Efron) acted on stage with the Hollytown Theater. He started his Hollywood career with an uncredited part in the film Freshman Year and played minor roles in feature films at various studios. In 1942, he joined the Pasadena Playhouse, and received his first co-star billing in the film The Panther's Claw together with Sidney Blackmer, and showed promise in Secrets of a Co-Ed  with Otto Kruger.

Vallin's fortunes improved in 1943 when he was hired as the villain in the East Side Kids comedy Clancy Street Boys. Producer Sam Katzman liked Vallin's darkly handsome looks and convincing delivery of dialogue, and cast him first as a juvenile lead (in Ghosts on the Loose) and then as a full-fledged leading man (in Vallin's only starring film, Smart Guy). When producer Katzman moved from Monogram Pictures to Columbia Pictures, he took Rick Vallin with him. This sealed Vallin's fate as a player in low-budget "B" movies, but it also gave him more than 10 years of job security. Vallin worked steadily in many of Katzman's features and serials, playing a variety of character roles: streetwise reporters, sinister villains, heroic internationals, and savage natives. His voice was also heard as the narrator of coming-attractions trailers.

Occasionally he showed up in such television series as Brave Eagle, Sheriff of Cochise, Bat Masterson, Jefferson Drum, The Adventures of Wild Bill Hickok, The Lone Ranger and Wyatt Earp. He was also cast on The Adventures of Superman, as well in both The Gene Autry Show and The Roy Rogers Show. His last appearance was a guest role on Daniel Boone in 1966.

Death 
Vallin died in Los Angeles, California, at the age of 57. He is interred at Eden Memorial Park in Mission Hills, California.

Selected filmography

Films

 Freshman Year (1938) - Upperclassman (uncredited)
 Dramatic School (1938) - Student (uncredited)
 Newsboys' Home (1938) - Newsboy (uncredited)
 Desperate Cargo (1941) - Radioman Stevens
 Escort Girl (1941) - Jack
 The Corsican Brothers (1941) - De Revenau's Friend at Opera (uncredited)
 Pardon My Stripes (1942) - Red (uncredited)
 Sleepytime Gal (1942) - Clerk (uncredited)
 The Panther's Claw (1942) - Anthony 'Tony' Abbot
 Flying with Music (1942) - Juan Breganza (uncredited)
 Perils of the Royal Mounted (1942, Serial) - Little Wolf
 Friendly Enemies (1942) - Soldier (uncredited)
 King of the Stallions (1942) - Sina-Oga (Little Coyote)
 Youth on Parade (1942) - Customer (uncredited)
 Secrets of a Co-Ed (1942) - Nick Jordan
 Stand By All Networks (1942) - Sound Control Room Engineer (uncredited)
 Lady from Chungking (1942) - Rodney Carr
 A Night for Crime (1943) - Arthur Evans - Chauffeur
 Corregidor (1943) - Cpl. Pinky Mason
 Clancy Street Boys (1943) - George Mooney
 Riders of the Rio Grande (1943) - Tom Owens
 Ghosts on the Loose (1943) - Jack
 Isle of Forgotten Sins (1943) - Johnny Pacific
 Wagon Tracks West (1943) - Dr. John Fleetwing
 Nearly Eighteen (1943) - Tony Morgan
 Smart Guy (1943) - Johnny Reagan
 The Desert Song (1943) - French Officer (uncredited)
 The Desert Hawk (1944, Serial) - (uncredited)
 Army Wives (1944) - Barney
 Secrets of a Sorority Girl (1945) - Paul Reynolds
 Dangerous Money (1946) - Tao Erickson
 Northwest Outpost (1947) - Dovkin
 Last of the Redmen (1947) - Uncas
 The Sea Hound (1947, Serial) - Manila Pete
 Two Blondes and a Redhead (1947) - Freddie Ainsley
 Brick Bradford (1947, Serial) - Sandy Sanderson
 Bob and Sally (1948) - Jim Cooper
 Jungle Jim (1948) - Kolu - Chief of the Masai
 Tarzan's Magic Fountain (1949) - Mountain Leader, Flaming Arrow Shooter (uncredited)
 Shamrock Hill  (1949) - Oliver Matthews
 Tuna Clipper (1949) - Silvestre Pereira
 Batman and Robin (1949, Serial) - Barry Brown
 Adventures of Sir Galahad (1949, Serial) - Sir Gawain
 Life of St. Paul Series (1949, Serial) - Man in Lystra
 Killer Shark (1950) - Joe - crewman
 Cody of the Pony Express (1950, Serial) - Henchman Denver [Chs.1-4]
 Comanche Territory (1950) - Pakanah
 Captive Girl (1950) - Chief Mahala
 State Penitentiary (1950) - Tom - Prison Guard
 Snow Dog (1950) - Louis Blanchard
 Atom Man vs. Superman (1950, Serial) - Power Company Truck Worker [Ch. 9] (uncredited)
 Rio Grande Patrol (1950) - Capt. Alberto Trevino
 Counterspy Meets Scotland Yard (1950) - Agent McCullough
 Revenue Agent (1950) - Al Chaloopka - Henchman
 Fighting Coast Guard (1951) - Marine (uncredited)
 Roar of the Iron Horse - Rail-Blazer of the Apache Trail (1951, Serial) - White Eagle [Chs. 1–3, 6, 12] (uncredited)
 When the Redskins Rode (1951) - Duprez (uncredited)
 Hurricane Island (1951) - Coba (uncredited)
 Jungle Manhunt (1951) - Matusa Chief Bono
 Yellow Fin (1951) - Jan
 The Magic Carpet (1951) - Abdul
 Captain Video: Master of the Stratosphere (1951, Serial) - Ranger Brown [Chs. 7–8, 11, 13] (uncredited)
 Lone Star (1952) - Apache Brave (uncredited)
 Aladdin and His Lamp (1952) - Captain of the Guard
 King of the Congo (1952, Serial) - Andreov
 Thief of Damascus (1952) - Gate Guard (uncredited)
 Blackhawk (1952, Serial) - Stan / Boris
 Strange Fascination (1952) - Carlo
 Son of Geronimo: Apache Avenger (1952, Serial) - Henchman Eadie
 Woman in the Dark (1952) - Phil Morello
 Voodoo Tiger (1952) - Sgt. Bono
 Star of Texas (1953) - Texas Ranger William Vance
 The Homesteaders (1953) - Slim
 Salome (1953) - Sailor (uncredited)
 Trail Blazers (1953) - Officer Lundig
 The Marksman (1953) - Leo Santee
 Topeka (1953) - Ray Hammond
 Fighting Lawman (1953) - Manuel Jackson
 The Golden Idol (1954) - Abdullah
 Ma and Pa Kettle at Home (1954) - Indian (uncredited)
 Thunder Pass (1954) - Reeger
 Riding with Buffalo Bill (1954, Serial) - Reb Morgan
 Sign of the Pagan (1954) - Cavalry Officer (uncredited)
 Day of Triumph (1954) - James
 Bowery to Bagdad (1955) - Selim
 Treasure of Ruby Hills (1955) - Robert Vernon
 Dial Red O (1955) - Deputy Clark
 The Man from Bitter Ridge (1955) - Townsman (uncredited)
 The Adventures of Captain Africa (1955, Serial) - Ted Arnold
 King of the Carnival (1955, Serial) - Art Kerr
 The Scarlet Coat (1955) - Mounted Lieutenant Escorting Maj. Andre (uncredited)
 At Gunpoint (1955) - Moore (uncredited)
 Perils of the Wilderness (1956, Serial) - Little Bear
 Terror at Midnight (1956) - Police Officer Gaudino
 Frontier Gambler (1956) - Gambler #3 (uncredited)
 Three for Jamie Dawn (1956) - Policeman (uncredited)
 Gun Brothers (1956) - Gomez (uncredited)
 Fighting Trouble (1956) - Vic Savinie (uncredited)
 You Can't Run Away from It (1956) - Reporter (uncredited)
 Naked Gun (1956) - Savage (henchman)
 Untamed Mistress (1956) - Henchman
 The Storm Rider (1957) - Jack Feylan (uncredited)
 The Badge of Marshal Brennan (1957) - Deputy Jody
 Jet Pilot (1957) - Sergeant (uncredited)
 Raiders of Old California (1957) - Burt
 The Tijuana Story (1957) - Ricardo - Club Manager (uncredited)
 Escape from Red Rock (1957) - Judd Bowman
 Bullwhip (1958) - Marshal Hendricks
 Pier 5, Havana (1959) - Pablo (uncredited)
 The Wizard of Baghdad (1960) - Guard (uncredited)
 The Quick Gun (1964) - Johnson (uncredited)

Television shows

 The Adventures of Kit Carson (1952–1953) - Henchman / Piney / Bob Mason / Deputy Marton / Henchman
 Hopalong Cassidy (1952–1954) - Marco Rodriguez / Ramon Torres / Dr. Johnny Tall Horse
 The Adventures of Wild Bill Hickok (1952–1956) - Pete / Henchman Melford / Frank Norton
 Death Valley Days (1953) Lieutenant Bob Hastings / Rod Ross
 The Gene Autry Show (1953–1954) - Yancy - Gunslinger henchman / Vasco - Gang Leader / Doc McCoy / Big Tim Brady
 The Roy Rogers Show (1953–1957) - Stanton / Jim Wilson
 Annie Oakley (1954–1956) - Henchman Al / Al / Billy / The Abilene Kid / Joe McGee / Doyle / Gil Warren / Johnny Storm / Outlaw
 Wyatt Earp (1955–1956) - Zach Newcombe / Buff Yancy
 The Lone Ranger (1955–1957) - Blue Feather / Crazy Wolf
 Adventures of Superman (1955–1958) - Pallini the Human Fly / Rick Sable / Pruitt - Thug #1 / Scarface
 Four Star Playhouse (1956) - Officer
 Highway Patrol (1957) - Simpson
 Official Detective (1957, US TV series episode "The Man With The Goatee") - Goatee
 The Adventures of Rin Tin Tin (1957) - Pacing Bear / Gahewa
 M Squad (1958) - 'Blue Indigo' Requestor at Ballroom
 Bat Masterson (1961) - Jenks
 The Prisoner (1966)
 Daniel Boone (1966) - Sentry (final appearance)

References

External links

1919 births
1977 deaths
American male film actors
American male television actors
Soviet emigrants to the United States
American people of Russian-Jewish descent
Russian male film actors
Russian male television actors
20th-century American male actors